Ryszard Morawski (born 2 March 1933 in Warsaw) is a Polish artist. He is a painter (battle painting, historical uniforms and equipment), illustrator, toy designer and sculptor of tin figures.

He studied painting under Michał Bylina and Antoni Trzeszczkowski at the Academy of Fine Arts in Warsaw.

Publications 
Books
 Ryszard Morawski, Henryk Wielecki: Wojsko Księstwa Warszawskiego. Kawaleria (1992)
 Ryszard Morawski, Henryk Wielecki: Wojsko Księstwa Warszawskiego. Generalicja, sztaby (1996)
 Ryszard Morawski, Andrzej Nieuważny: Wojsko Księstwa Warszawskiego. Artyleria, inżynierowie, saperzy (2004, ; 2011)
 Ryszard Morawski, Adam Paczuski: Wojsko Księstwa Warszawskiego. Ułani,  gwardie honorowe, pospolite ruszenie, żandarmeria konna. Tom I-II (2009)
 Ryszard Morawski, Adam Paczuski: Wojsko Księstwa Warszawskiego. Piechota, gwardie narodowe, weterani. Tom I-II (2014)
 Ryszard Morawski, Sławomir Leśniewski: Wojsko polskie w służbie Napoleona. Legia Nadwiślańska. Lansjerzy Nadwiślańscy. (2008)
 Ryszard Morawski, Andrzej Nieuważny: Wojsko polskie w służbie Napoleona. Gwardia: szwoleżerowie, Tatarzy, eklererzy, grenadierzy. (2008)
 Ryszard Morawski, Andrzej Dusiewicz: Wojsko polskie w służbie Napoleona. Legiony Polskie we Włoszech. Legia Naddunajska. Legia Polsko-Włoska. Legia Północna. (2010)
Postcards
 Ryszard Morawski. Mundur polski 1797–1815. Warsaw 2010 (90 postcards in 10 separate cases, 14,8 x 10,4 cm)
 Ryszard Morawski: Józef Antoni Poniatowski 1763–1813; publikacja pamiątkowa z okazji 200-lecia śmierci księcia Józefa A. Poniatowskiego. Warsaw 2012 (12 postcards, 21 x 14,8 cm)
 Ryszard Morawski. Napoleon Bonaparte i jego dzielni dowódcy. Warsaw 2016 (9 postcards, 14,8 x 10,4 cm)
Calendars
 Ryszard Morawski. Wojsko Księstwa Warszawskiego. Kawaleria [calendar] 1992
 Ryszard Morawski. Poniatowski i inni [calendar] 2013

Reviews 
 Maciej Rosalak: Śladem ułanów i szwoleżerów. Uważam Rze HISTORIA, nr 9 December 2012 p. 92-93
 Michał Karpowicz: Karabela w mundurze. Za mundurem panny sznurem – może to znowu ma sens. W sieci Historii, no. 4 (11) April 2014
 Allan Chappet: L’armée du duché de Varsovie. RSN Reuve du Souvenir Napoléonien no. 490 p. 63
 Allan Chappet: La Légion Polonaise. RSN Reuve du Souvenir Napoléonien no. 491 p. 68
 Allan Chappet: L’armée du duché de Varsovie. RSN Reuve du Souvenir Napoléonien no. 499 p. 59
 Markus Stein: Rezension: Polnische Truppen der Napoleonischen Zeit

References 

1933 births
Polish painters
Polish male painters
Living people
Artists from Warsaw